The  opened in Izumi, Osaka Prefecture, Japan, in 1982. The new wing was added in 1997. The local Kubo family, founders of the Kubosō cotton textile business, donated the land, buildings, collection, and funds for the Museum's management to the city. The collection of some eleven thousand works includes two National Treasures (the Kasen Uta-awase scroll and the Southern Song celadon vase with phoenix ears known as Bansei) and twenty-nine Important Cultural Properties.

See also
 Fujita Art Museum
 List of National Treasures of Japan (writings: Japanese books)
 List of National Treasures of Japan (crafts: others)

References

External links
  Kubosō Memorial Museum of Arts, Izumi
  Kubosō Memorial Museum of Arts, Izumi
  Collection

Art museums and galleries in Osaka Prefecture
Izumi, Osaka
Art museums established in 1982
1982 establishments in Japan